Faidherbe may refer to:

 Faidherbe (train), a former train in France
 ST Faidherbe, a Senegalese tugboat

People with the surname
 Henri Brosselard-Faidherbe (1855–1893), French military officer and explorer, the stepson of Louis Faidherbe
 Louis Faidherbe (1818–1889), French general and Governor of Senegal